Monarchy is a Channel 4 British TV series, 2004–2007, by British academic David Starkey charting the political and ideological history of the English monarchy from the Saxon period to modern times. The show also aired on PBS stations throughout the United States, courtesy of PBS-member station WNET. In Australia, all four seasons were broadcast on ABC1 from May 2005 onwards.

Episodes

Series 1

Series 2

Series 3

Series 4

External links
 
 Monarchy  at Channel4.com
 'I'd wake up and think: God, did I really say that?' by Lynn Barber Sunday 10 October 2004 in The Observer "With a new book and TV series to promote, TV history don David Starkey is finally mellowing. So much for the erstwhile rudest man in Britain..."
 

Channel 4 original programming
Documentary films about British royalty
Television series about the history of the United Kingdom
Television series about the history of England
2004 British television series debuts
2004 British television series endings